Padanilam Higher Secondary School, Nooranad is a senior secondary school in Mavelikkara Taluk, Alappuzha District of India. The school is affiliated to the Kerala State Education Board and Kerala Higher Secondary Examination Board. Established in 1951, It is one of the oldest schools in Alappuzha District.

Reference

High schools and secondary schools in Kerala
Schools in Alappuzha district
Educational institutions established in 1951
1951 establishments in India